Lübeck Airport  is a minor German airport located  south of Lübeck, the second-largest city in the state of Schleswig-Holstein, and  northeast of Hamburg. It is the secondary airport for the Hamburg Metropolitan Region, after the much bigger Hamburg Airport, and is used for domestic and some occasional charter flights. The airport was therefore sometimes called "Hamburg Lübeck" for marketing purposes.

History

Early years
The construction of the airport began in 1916 and was completed in 1917 when it started its operations as a military airfield.  At the end of World War I the airfield was shut down.  In 1933 it was re-opened and extended by the Luftwaffe.  During the Berlin Blockade after World War II, the Royal Air Force flew coal to Berlin and refugees to West Germany using Douglas Dakota aircraft.

Development into a low-cost airport
After the re-unification of Germany, the airport started to grow slightly when several airlines started flying to Lübeck. In 1997, the arrival terminal was re-constructed and extended.

Ryanair started to operate from the airport in 2000 with the first flights to London-Stansted. Ryanair's route system expanded over the years until 2009. Wizz Air started operations in 2006 with flights to Gdańsk, and later other eastern European destinations. Discussions about Ryanair opening a base at the airport were held since 2009 without results.

Infratil, an infrastructure investment company from New Zealand held a 90% shareholding from November 2005 until the end of October 2009, when it sold its shares back to the City of Lübeck. The new principal operator, Flughafen Lübeck GmbH, had been searching for an investor since then, when in 2013 the airport was sold to a private investor.

In 2010, both the financial crisis and the eruption of the Eyjafjallajökull led to a general decrease in passenger numbers and destinations.

A new ILS CAT II system went operational in February 2014, allowing planes to operate at the airport in more difficult weather conditions. As of March 2014, there were four lawsuits active against a further expansion of the airport.

Bankruptcy
On 23 April 2014 Lübeck Airport filed for bankruptcy. A few days earlier it had been reported that the owner, which bought the airport in 2013, had pulled out again. The airport continued to operate while the liquidator reviewed possible strategies. In July 2014, the bankrupt airport was sold to Chinese investor PuRen Germany GmbH, a subsidiary of PuRen Group.

In June 2014 Ryanair announced it would leave Lübeck Airport as of October 2014 due to the airport's uncertain future. Soon this date was revised to July 2014, when the year-round route to Bergamo as well as the seasonal services to Palma de Mallorca and Pisa ceased. Meanwhile, Ryanair announced it would start new routes from Hamburg Airport instead.

In September 2015, the airport's new owner, the German subsidiary of the Chinese PuRen Group, also declared bankruptcy. The state of Schleswig-Holstein had already announced it would not invest in the airport. New investors were sought and operations would be maintained until further notice. As of January 2016, the selection process for a new owner of the airport was still ongoing.

In March 2016, Wizz Air announced that it would cease all operations to and from Lübeck by 15 April 2016, leaving the airport without any scheduled passenger services. The routes to Gdańsk,  Kiev–Zhulyany and Skopje were relocated to Hamburg Airport, while the flights to Riga as well as the newly established route to Sofia ceased without replacement. The last scheduled commercial flight, a Wizz Air service to Sofia, left Lübeck at 20:05 local time on 15 April 2016.

Resumption of operations
In January 2020, Lübeck Airport announced plans to start a virtual airline, with scheduled flights to Stuttgart and Munich from 1 June 2020. For this purpose, an ATR 72-500 was purchased, which will is flown under the Lübeck Air brand and operated by Air Alsie. Flights eventually began on 17 August 2020, due to the COVID-19 pandemic. In March 2023, Lübeck Air announced it would its ATR flights and seek to start jet operations with another airline. They also published a revised route network focusing on more leisure destinations, ending the route to Stuttgart.

Facilities
Lübeck Airport features one small terminal building, containing check-in facilities, a shop and some restaurants. The apron features three stands for walk-boarding, which are suitable for mid-sized aircraft such as the Airbus A320, as well as some stands for smaller general aviation aircraft.

Airlines and destinations

The following airlines operate regular scheduled flights at Lübeck Airport:

Statistics

Ground transportation

Car
Lübeck Airport can be reached via motorways A1 which leads towards Hamburg and A20 which runs to the east through Mecklenburg-Vorpommern (exit Lübeck-Süd).

Bus
The local bus line 6 runs every 30 minutes and connects the airport with Lübeck's main bus station ("ZOB"). A regional shuttle bus, line A20, runs from the airport to Hamburg's central train station, stopping at the central coach station "ZOB" nearby. The schedule of the A20 depends on the aircraft arriving in and departing from Lübeck.

Train
Regional trains run every hour between Kiel and Lüneburg, stopping at the airport's own station Lübeck-Flughafen as well as Lübeck main station. Connecting trains are available at Lübeck Hauptbahnhof or in Büchen to Hamburg and other destinations.

See also
 Transport in Germany
 List of airports in Germany

References

Bibliography

External links

 Official website
 
 

Transport in Lübeck
Buildings and structures in Lübeck
Airports in Schleswig-Holstein